David Liggins is a philosopher at the University of Manchester with research interests in metaphysics and philosophy of mathematics.

Education and career 
Liggins received his PhD in 2005 from the University of Sheffield. He then spent a year at University of Cambridge's faculty of philosophy before becoming a lecturer at the University of Manchester in 2006. In 2016, he was appointed joint editor of Analysis with Chris Daly. He served as the sole editor of the journal from 2017–2021 when it was announced that he would be joint editor alongside Stacie Friend and Lee Walters.

References

Further reading 

 
 
 
 
 
 
 
 
 

Year of birth missing (living people)
Living people
21st-century British philosophers
Alumni of the University of Sheffield
Academics of the University of Cambridge
People associated with the University of Manchester